The 1978 World 600, the 19th running of the event, was a NASCAR Winston Cup Series racing event that was held on May 28, 1978, at Charlotte Motor Speedway in Concord, North Carolina.

Race report
Zsa Zsa Gabor served as the celebrity grand marshall. There were 40 drivers on the starting grid. An audience of 125,000 fans would see 43 lead changes along with 32 laps under a caution flag. The entire race from green flag to checkered flag lasted for four hours and twenty minutes.

During the first 100 laps, David Pearson, Darrell Waltrip, and Donnie Allison were fighting for the lead. The final laps would become a battle between Donnie Allison, Darrell Waltrip, and Benny Parsons. Waltrip would eventually defeat Donnie Allison by two seconds in his 1978 Chevrolet Monte Carlo. Joining him on victory lane would be his wife Stevie. Jerry Jolly would be the last-place finisher due to problems with his suspension on lap 20. The lowest driver to actually finish the race was D.K. Ulrich.

After the race, Cale Yarborough would only be 30 points behind Benny Parsons in the overall championship standings. The number of points for Dale Earnhardt and Ron Hutcherson were never recorded. Earnhardt got the #98 car ride when Willy T. Ribbs got fired from it because he was arrested for reckless driving; Ribbs had qualified the vehicle in 28th place but Earnhardt would finish the race in 17th place.

The entire prize purse for this race was $310,491 ($ when adjusted for inflation); Waltrip received $48,608 ($ when adjusted for inflation) while Jerry Jolly took home $1,090 ($ when adjusted for inflation).

Roland Wlodyka would end his professional driving career with the NASCAR Cup Series after the end of this racing event.

Racial controversy
Willy T. Ribbs was expected to be at this NASCAR Cup Series event, being a popular African-American race car driver of the time. After failing to appear at two special practice sessions, he was sacked and replaced with then-obscure driver Dale Earnhardt; who back then specialized in short track racing and was not yet a serious championship contender. A lot of traditionalists chided the opportunities that Ribbs received; getting into the higher levels of NASCAR simply because he was black.

Qualifying

Finishing order
Section reference:

 Darrell Waltrip
 Donnie Allison
 Bobby Allison
 Cale Yarborough
 David Pearson
 Benny Parsons
 Buddy Baker
 Richard Petty
 Sterling Marlin
 Bruce Hill
 Grant Adcox
 Morgan Shepherd
 Dick May
 Bill Elliott
 Buddy Arrington
 John Utsman
 Dale Earnhardt
 Gary Myers
 Dick Brooks
 Richard Childress
 Roland Wlodyka
 J.D. McDuffie
 Frank Warren
 Tommy Gale
 Baxter Price
 Skip Manning
 Jim Vandiver*
 Ricky Rudd
 D.K. Ulrich
 Ronnie Thomas*
 Tighe Scott*
 Dave Marcis*
 Lennie Pond*
 Connie Saylor*
 Neil Bonnett*
 Harry Gant*
 Jimmy Means*
 Al Holbert*
 Ron Hutcherson*
 Jerry Jolly*

* Driver failed to finish race

Timeline
Section reference:
 Start of race: David Pearson had the advantage over all the other drivers as the green flag was waved.
 Lap 20: Problems with the vehicle's suspension forced Jerry Jolly into becoming the last-place finisher.
 Lap 117: Caution due to a four-car accident on turn two; caution ended on lap 129.
 Lap 129: The vehicle's throttle was dying, Jimmy Means had to exit the event early.
 Lap 140: Harry Gant managed to overheat his racing vehicle after racing at high speeds.
 Lap 157: Neil Bonnett overheated his vehicle's engine and had to leave the race.
 Lap 184: Connie Saylor actually overheated his engine after racing for so long.
 Lap 198: The vehicle's engine could not stand any more high speed racing, forcing Dave Marcis out of the race.
 Lap 207: Lennie Pond had a terminal crash.
 Lap 308: Tighe Scott had a rough time with his vehicle's engine and had to accept a 31st-place finish.
 Lap 318: The steering on Ronnie Thomas's vehicle wasn't raceworthy anymore, ending his day on the track.
 Lap 343: Engine problems forced Jim Vandiver to be the final DNF of the race.
 Lap 368: Caution due to debris on turn four; caution ended on lap 371.
 Lap 396: Dale Earnhardt managed to spin his vehicle, caution ended on lap 398.
 Lap 400: David Pearson and Benny Parsons had an accident on turn two.
 Finish: Darrell Waltrip was officially declared the winner of the event.

Standings after the race

References

World 600
World 600
NASCAR races at Charlotte Motor Speedway